The 2020–21 Coupe de France was the 104th season of the main football cup competition of France. The competition was organised by the French Football Federation (FFF) and is normally open to all clubs in French football, as well as clubs from the overseas departments and territories (Guadeloupe, French Guiana, Martinique, Mayotte, New Caledonia, Tahiti, Réunion, Saint Martin, and Saint Pierre and Miquelon). Due to the travel restrictions related to the COVID-19 pandemic, the club from Saint Pierre and Miquelon did not progress beyond the second round and qualifying clubs from New Caledonia and Tahiti did not participate.

The competition was paused on 28 October 2020, when France entered a second period of lockdown due to the COVID-19 pandemic. On 17 December, the FFF announced a new format to allow the competition to complete. On 22 December, the FFF announced a plan to resume the competition from 31 January 2021.

On 19 January 2021, the FFF produced a new calendar for the amateur path and the final stages.

Paris Saint-Germain were the defending champions, and they won a record fourteenth title with a 2–0 win over Monaco in the final.

Dates

Dates for the first two qualifying round were set by the individual Regional leagues. The original calendar had the remaining qualifying rounds, the seventh and eight round, and the round of 64 taking place on weekends. The later rounds up to, but not including, the final, would take place on midweek evenings. The final would take place on Saturday 24 April 2021.

On 28 October 2020, French President Emmanuel Macron announced a second COVID-19 lockdown, including the suspension of all amateur football, for four weeks. The following day, the FFF confirmed the suspension of senior football at all levels below Championnat National. This caused the suspension of the competition, and the postponement of the sixth round and remaining fifth round matches. On 17 November, the FFF formally announced the postponement of the seventh and eighth round until January 2021.

On 22 December, the FFF announced a plan to resume the competition from 31 January 2021, subject to COVID-19 restrictions being removed as planned.

On 19 January 2021, the ministère des sports gave the go-ahead for amateur clubs involved in the competition to resume training, and the FFF produced a new calendar for the amateur path and the final stages.

Notable rule changes
Following the changes introduced regarding Guadeloupe, French Guiana and Martinique last year, teams from Réunion and Mayotte also played an internal match in the seventh round. This meant an additional team qualifying for the seventh round from Mayotte.

Ligue 2 sides joined the competition at the eighth round, a change which the FFF stated was only for this season's competition. This meant fewer teams would qualify from each region's preliminary rounds.

Other than the final, there was no extra time in fixtures this season. Tied matches were settled by a penalty shoot-out after ninety minutes.

On 22 October 2020, the FFF announced that clubs from New Caledonia and Tahiti would not participate in the seventh round due to the ongoing COVID-19 situation. Two clubs were awarded byes to the eighth round. A decision was to follow on 12 November regarding other overseas teams participating in the eighth round.

On 25 November, the FFF announced that the seventh round winners from Réunion, Guadeloupe, Mayotte and French Guiana would play their eighth round matches against each other in December, rather than being integrated into the main eighth round draw when the competition restarts. The competition in Martinique would restart at the seventh round when the mainland tournament restarts.

On 17 December, the FFF announced a change of format to avoid cancelling the competition due to a lack of available dates. The competition would be divided into two parts: A professional path, involving teams from Ligue 1 and Ligue 2, and an amateur path, involving mainland teams qualifying from the preliminary rounds and the overseas qualifiers. The amateur path was straight knockout over two rounds (seventh, eighth), taking 124 qualifiers down to 31. The three overseas qualifiers re-joined the competition for the round of 64, resulting in seventeen qualifiers at the end of the path. The professional path started at the eighth round with the twenty Ligue 2 teams. The winners were then joined by the twenty Ligue 1 teams for the round of 64, resulting in fifteen qualifiers at the end of the path. The two paths joined for the Round of 32, and the rest of the competition was straight knockout.

Teams

Round 1 to 6

The first six rounds, and any preliminaries required, were organised by the Regional Leagues and the Overseas Territories, who allowed teams from within their league structure to enter at any point up to the third round. Teams from Championnat National 3 entered at the third round, those from Championnat National 2 entered at the fourth round and those from Championnat National entered at the fifth round.

The number of teams entering at each qualifying round was as follows:

Round 7
124 qualifiers from the Regional Leagues were joined by the ten qualifiers from the Overseas Territories.

Regional Leagues

Nouvelle Aquitaine (11 teams)
 Trélissac FC (4)
 Genêts Anglet (5)
 Aviron Bayonnais FC (5)
 US Lège Cap Ferret (5)
 FC Libourne (5)
 Stade Poitevin FC (5)
 FCE Mérignac Arlac (6)
 OL Saint-Liguaire Niort (6)
 AS Aixoise (7)
 AS Panazol (7)
 Association Saint-Laurent Billère (9)

Pays de la Loire (9 teams)
 Stade Lavallois (3)
 Voltigeurs de Châteaubriant (4)
 Les Herbiers VF (4)
 US Changé (5)
 Vendée Fontenay Foot (5)
 US Philbertine Football (5)
 Sablé FC (5)
 Olympique Saumur FC (5)
 Élan de Gorges Foot (7)

Centre-Val de Loire (4 teams)
 US Orléans (3)
 Bourges 18 (4)
 SO Romorantin (4)
 Tours FC (5)

Corsica (2 teams)
 Gazélec Ajaccio (4)
 AS Furiani-Agliani (5)

Bourgogne-Franche-Comté (7 teams)
 ASM Belfort (4)
 Jura Sud Foot (4)
 Louhans-Cuiseaux FC (4)
 Racing Besançon (5)
 CA Pontarlier (5)
 Union Cosnoise Sportive (6)
 UF Mâconnais (6)

Grand Est (16 teams)
 SAS Épinal'(4)
 FCSR Haguenau (4)
 SC Schiltigheim (4)
 CS Sedan Ardennes (4)
 CSO Amnéville (5)
 AS Prix-lès-Mézières (5)
 FC Saint-Louis Neuweg (5)
 ES Thaon (5)
 FC Soleil Bischheim (6)
 FC Obermodern (6)
 EF Reims Sainte-Anne Châtillons (6)
 FC Saint-Meziery (6)
 SSEP Hombourg-Haut (7)
 AS Ribeauvillé (7)
 FCO Strasbourg Koenigshoffen 06 (7)
 AS Portugais Saint-Francois Thionville (7)

Méditerranée (4 teams)
 Aubagne FC (4)
 Athlético Marseille (5)
 AS Maximoise (6)
 ES Saint-Zacharie (6)

Occitanie (9 teams)
 Canet Roussillon FC (4)
 US Colomiers Football (4)
 Olympique Alès (5)
 AS Fabrègues (5)
 Castelnau Le Crès FC (6)
 FC Marssac-Rivières-Senouillac Rives du Tarn (6)
 Onet-le-Château (6)
 Entente Saint-Clément-Montferrier (6)
 Montauban FCTG (7)

Hauts-de-France (18 teams)
 US Boulogne (3)
 AS Beauvais Oise (4)
 Olympique Saint-Quentin (4)
 AC Amiens (5)
 US Chantilly (5)
 Olympique Marcquois Football (5)
 US Saint-Omer (5)
 Arras FA (6)
 Écureuils Itancourt-Neuville (6)
 ES Lambresienne (6)
 US Laon (6)
 US Lesquin (6)
 ESC Longueau (6)
 FC Loon-Plage (6)
 US Saint-Maurice Loos-en-Gohelle (6)
 AS Steenvorde (6)
 OS Aire-sur-la-Lys (7)
 SC Bailleulois (8)

Normandy (7 teams)
 US Avranches (3)
 US Quevilly-Rouen (3)
 FC Rouen (4)
 AG Caennaise (5)
 AF Virois (5)
 ESM Gonfreville (6)
 ESFC Falaise (7)

Brittany (12 teams)
Stade Briochin (3)
 US Saint-Malo (4)
 Stade Plabennécois (4)
 Vannes OC (4)
 Dinan-Léhon FC (5)
 Plouzané AC (5)
 Saint-Colomban Sportive Locminé (5)
 Saint-Pierre de Milizac (5)
 FC Guichen (6)
 US Liffré (6)
 US Montagnarde (6)
 EA Saint-Renan (6)

Paris-Île-de-France (9 teams)
 US Créteil-Lusitanos (3)
 Red Star FC (3)
 Football Club 93 Bobigny-Bagnolet-Gagny (4)
 FC Fleury 91 (4)
 US Lusitanos Saint-Maur (4)
 JA Drancy (5)
 Saint-Brice FC (6)
 US Sénart-Moissy (6)
 CA Vitry (6)

Auvergne-Rhône-Alpes (16 teams)
 Annecy FC (3)
 FC Villefranche (3)
 Andrézieux-Bouthéon FC (4)
 FC Chamalières (4)
 Le Puy Foot 43 Auvergne (4)
 Moulins Yzeure Foot (4)
 GFA Rumilly-Vallières (4)
 AS Saint-Priest (4)
 FC Aurillac Arpajon Cantal Auvergne (5)
 FC Limonest Saint-Didier (5)
 Thonon Évian FC (5)
 US Feurs (6)
 FC Rhône Vallées (6)
 AC Seyssinet (6)
 Vénissieux FC (6)
 AS Nord Vignoble (8)

Overseas Territories teams

 Mayotte: 2 teams
 FC Mtsapéré
 Pamandzi SC

 Réunion: 2 teams
 JS Saint-Pierroise
 US Sainte-Marienne

 Martinique: 2 teams
 AS Samaritaine
 Club Franciscain

 Guadeloupe: 2 teams
 Phare du Canal
 Unité Sainte-Rosienne
 French Guiana: 2 teams
 US Sinnamary
 ASU Grand Santi

Round 8

Overseas teams
Two matches between teams from Mayotte, Guadeloupe, Réunion and French Guiana. The team from Martinique received a bye.

Amateur path
The 62 qualifiers from the seventh round played a straight knockout round.

Professional path
The 20 Ligue 2 teams joined the competition, and played a straight knockout round.

Round of 64

Amateur path
The 31 qualifiers from the eighth round were joined by the two overseas teams qualifying from the eighth round, and the team from Martinique. They played a straight knockout round. Following petition by the Ligue de Football de Martinique, the team from Martinique were guaranteed a draw against one of the qualifying overseas teams.

Professional path
The ten Ligue 2 qualifiers from the eighth round were joined by the twenty Ligue 1 sides. They played a straight knockout round.

Round of 32, and later
The seventeen amateur path qualifiers and the fifteen professional path qualifiers joined for a straight knockout competition.

Seventh round 
The seventh round was split over an extended period, starting on 21 November 2020.
 Playoff ties between teams from the overseas leagues of Guadeloupe, French Guiana and Mayotte took place between 21 and 29 November.
 The playoff tie between teams from Martinique took place on 13 January 2021.
 The matches involving the 124 qualifying teams from mainland France took place entirely within the regional leagues, except for those leagues providing an odd number of qualifiers, where inter-league matches were drawn. This resulted in ties between Nouvelle-Aquitaine and Occitanie, Normandy and Pays de la Loire, and Bourgogne-Franche-Comté and Paris-Île-de-France. The pre-draw was published on 22 January. Matches took place on 5, 6 and 7 February 2021, with three postponed to 13 and 14 February, awaiting outcomes of ties in the previous round.

Overseas ties

Mainland ties

Auvergne-Rhône-Alpes group

Brittany group

Centre-Val de Loire group

Grand Est group

Hauts-de-France group
See also the combined Hauts-de-France and Corsica group

Combined Hauts-de-France and Corsica group
The two qualifiers from Corsica were grouped with the qualifiers from the last two games in the Hauts-de-France sixth round draw to ensure two qualifiers for the eighth round and one qualifier for the round of 64.

Méditerranée group

Combined Nouvelle-Aquitaine and Occitanie group
The qualifiers from Nouvelle-Aquitaine were grouped with the qualifiers from the last game in the Occitanie sixth round draw to ensure six qualifiers for the eighth round and three qualifiers for the round of 64.

Occitanie group

Combined Paris-Île-de-France and Bourgogne-Franche-Comté group
The nine qualifiers from Paris-Île-de-France and the seven qualifiers from Bourgogne-Franche-Comté were grouped together to ensure eight qualifiers for the eighth round and four qualifiers for the round of 64.

Combined Pays de la Loire and Normandy group
The nine qualifiers from Pays de la Loire and the seven qualifiers from Normandy were grouped together to ensure eight qualifiers for the eighth round and four qualifiers for the round of 64.

Eighth round 
The eighth round was separated into two paths. The professional path took place between the twenty teams from Ligue 2. The amateur path took place between the 62 mainland qualifiers from the seventh round. The ties involving teams from Mayotte, Guadeloupe, Réunion and French Guiana were pre-drawn on 25 November 2020. The team from Martinique received a bye for this round and directly qualified for the round of 64 on the amateur path.

 Overseas ties took place on 20 December.
 The draw for the professional path took place on 7 January 2021, with matches played on 19 and 20 January.
 In the amateur path, matches took place entirely within the regional leagues, with the winners of the three inter-league matches from the seventh round joining the region which had an odd number of qualifiers. The pre-draw was published on 22 January 2021. Matches took place on 13 and 14 February, with three postponed pending outcomes of ties in the previous round, and two postponed due to inclement weather.

Overseas ties

Professional path

Group A

Group B

Group C

Group D

Group E

Amateur path

Auvergne-Rhône-Alpes group

Brittany group

Centre-Val de Loire group

Grand Est group

Hauts-de-France group
See also the combined Hauts-de-France and Corsica group

Combined Hauts-de-France and Corsica group

Méditerranée group

Combined Nouvelle-Aquitaine and Occitanie group

Occitanie group

Combined Paris-Île-de-France and Bourgogne-Franche-Comté group

Combined Pays de la Loire and Normandy group

Round of 64 
The round of 64 was separated into two paths. The professional path took place between the twenty teams from Ligue 1 and the ten winners of the eighth round professional path. The amateur path took place between the 31 mainland qualifiers from the eighth round and the 3 overseas qualifiers. The tie between US Sinnamary and the team from Martinique was pre-drawn 18 December 2020.

 The draw for the professional path took place on 7 January 2021. Matches took place between 9 and 11 February.
 The draw for the amateur path took place on 12 February. Matches took place on 20, 21 and 25 February.

Professional path

Group A

Group B

Group C

Group D

Group E

Amateur path

Overseas tie

Overseas and mainland tie 
FC Mtsapéré were scheduled to face a team from the mainland at INF Clairefontaine, opponent to be decided in the main draw on 12 February 2021. However, having arrived at Roland Garros Airport on Réunion on 11 February, they were denied transit to France due to COVID-19 contact concerns, and informed they must return to Mayotte. A report on 12 February suggested it might have been possible for the team to isolate in Réunion and travel to France at a later date, but this did not happen.

On 17 February 2021, it was announced that FC Mtsapére would be allowed to depart for mainland France on 21 February, and would play their game on 25 February in Romorantin-Lanthenay.

Mainland ties

Group A

Group B

Group C

Group D

Round of 32 

The draw for the Round of 32 was held on 21 February 2021. It consisted of matches split into four groups, balanced primarily by geography but also to ensure an even spread of teams from different levels. Matches took place between 5 and 8 March.

Group A

Group B

Group C

Group D

Round of 16 

The draw for the Round of 16 was held on 8 March 2021. Matches took place on 17 March, and between 6 and 8 April.

Quarter-finals 
The draw for the quarter-finals was held on 9 April 2021. Matches took place on 20 and 21 April.

Semi-finals 
The draw for the semi-finals was held on 25 April 2021. Matches took place on 12 and 13 May.

Final

Notes

References

External links

 
France
Cup
Coupe de France seasons
Coupe de France, 2020-21